Terra is the debut full-length album by Norwegian/Swedish progressive metal band Cronian. The album was sporadically recorded through 2004 and 2005, with the two members of the band separated by their countries most of the time. The album was released in Europe on March 27, 2006, and on April 18, 2006 in North America.

Track listing
"Diode Earth" – 5:00 (Oystein G. Brun)
"Arctic Fever" – 5:42 (Brun, Andreas Hedlund)
"Cronian" – 5:18 (Brun, Hedlund)
"Iceolated" – 7:08 (Brun, Hedlund)
"Colures" – 3:12 (Hedlund)
"The Alp" – 6:04 (Brun, Hedlund)
"Nonexistence" – 5:06 (Brun)
"Illumine" – 7:13 (Brun)
"End(durance) -Part I" – 1:50 (Brun)

Personnel
Mr. V (Vintersorg, Borknagar, Waterclime, Fission) – vocals, bass, programming
Øystein G. Brun (Borknagar) – guitars and programming

Production
Arranged, produced and engineered By Cronian
Vocals engineered by Mattias Marklund
Mixed by Mr. V (Andreas Hedlund)
Mastered by Dan Swanö

Notes
Terra was mastered by musician and producer Dan Swanö, who is well known for his work with countless bands, particularly Edge of Sanity, Nightingale, and Bloodbath. The vocals were engineered by Mr. V's fellow Vintersorg band member Mattias Marklund. The photographs in the album booklet were also taken by Mattias.

References

2006 debut albums
Cronian albums
Century Media Records albums